Emer O'Toole is a researcher and writer who contributes to various online publications, including The Guardian and the feminist blog The Vagenda. She is from the West of Ireland, and lives in Montréal, where she is Assistant Professor of Irish Performance Studies at Concordia University.

Education and career 
O'Toole completed a BA in philosophy and English literature at National University of Ireland, Galway, and then a master of philosophy degree in Irish theater and performance at Trinity College in Dublin. She moved on to a PhD at Royal Holloway, University of London, which she completed in 2012. Her dissertation examined the ethics of intercultural theater practice. Articles and chapters based on this research were included in journals such as Target: International Journal of Translation Studies and The Journal of Adaptation in Film and Performance.

O'Toole spent a year doing postdoctoral research on Indigeneity in the Contemporary World project. She is currently an associate professor of Performance Studies, at the School of Irish Studies at Concordia University in Montreal. Her research explores the relationship between contemporary Irish performance and activism. She is a regular contributor to newspapers and magazines, such as Irish Times and The Guardian, writing about feminism and Ireland. She logs for the popular feminist site Vagenda, recites short stories for audio magazine 4'33", composes comedy sketches for the fledgling comedy troupe Wet Lettuce, and writes romantic poetry.

Her professional associations and affiliations include serving as a performance review editor for the Canadian Journal of Irish Studies, and as ambassador for the National Women's Council of Ireland. She is a fellow of Concordia's Simone de Beauvoir Institute.

In 2012, O'Toole caused an Internet storm when she appeared on a morning talk show and exposed her decision to stop removing her body hair. She discussed the negative responses this often engenders, but stated that "Our bodies should be there for us to enjoy - express ourselves. Instead, there’s a capitalist pressure on us where we are being coerced into buying a service or products, and told if you don’t then you are unhygienic or outdated."

In her first book, Girls Will Be Girls: Dressing Up, Playing Parts, and Daring to Act Differently, O'Toole explores how gender roles are performed. She draws on personal experience as well as academic sources, and has said that she hopes the book makes "Judith Butler's theory of performativity accessible...  to a wide demographic."

Personal life 
O'Toole is bisexual and polyamorous. As of April 2019, she was expecting her first child.

Publications 
 Books
 Girls Will Be Girls: Dressing Up, Playing Parts, and Daring to Act Differently. London: Orion, 2015
 Ethical Exchanges: Translation, Adaptation and Dramaturgy. O’Toole, Emer, Andrea Kristic Pelegri and Stuart Young, eds. Boston; Leiden: Brill, 2017
 Happy Families (upcoming), Orion: London, 2019

 Chapters
 "Intercultural Adaptation: The Ethics of Peter Brook's 11 & 12." Translation, Adaptation and Dramaturgy: Ethics in Dialogue, Ethics in Action. Ed. Emer O’Toole, Andrea Kristic Pelegri and Stuart Young. Boston; Leiden: Brill, 2017
 ‘The Eternal Interculture Wars: Reading the Controversy Surrounding Bisis Adigun and Roddy Doyle's Playboy of the Western World.’ Irish Migrant Adaptations: Memory, Performance and Place. Ed. Jason King, Matthew Spangler and Charlotte McIvor. 2018

 Peer-reviewed journal articles
 O'Toole, Emer. 'Panti Bliss Still Can’t Get Hitched: Meditations on Performativity, Drag, & Gay Marriage' Sexualities, 2018 
 'Guerilla Glamour: The Queer Tactics of Dr. Panti Bliss.' Eire-Ireland 52.4, 2017. 
 'Waking the Feminists: Re-imagining the Space of the National Theatre in the Era of the Celtic Phoenix.' Lit: Literature Interpretation Theory 28.2 (2017): 134-152.
 ‘Cultural Capital in Intercultural Theatre: A Study of Pan Pan Theatre Company’s The Playboy of the Western World.’ Target 25.1 ,2013. P. 407- 426.
 ‘Towards Best Intercultural Practice: A Study of Tim Supple’s Pan-Indian A Midsummer Night’s Dream.’ Journal of Adaptation in Film and Performance, 4.3, 2011. P. 289-302

References

External links 
 

Alumni of the University of Galway
Irish journalists
Irish feminists
Irish LGBT writers
Bisexual writers
Bisexual women
Academic staff of Concordia University
Living people
Year of birth missing (living people)
Bisexual academics
Polyamorous people